Foreign currency convertible bonds (FCCBs) are a special category of bonds. FCCBs are issued in currencies different from the issuing company's domestic currency. Corporates issue FCCBs to raise money in foreign currencies. These bonds retain all features of a convertible bond, making them very attractive to both the investors and the issuers.

These bonds assume great importance for multinational corporations and in the current business scenario of globalisation, where companies are constantly dealing in foreign currencies.

FCCBs are quasi-debt instruments and tradable on the stock exchange. Investors are hedge-fund arbitrators or foreign nationals.

FCCBs appear on the liabilities side of the issuing company's balance sheet.

Under IFRS provisions, a company must mark-to-market the amount of its outstanding bonds.

The relevant provisions for FCCB accounting are International Accounting Standards: IAS 39, IAS 32 and IFRS 7.

FCCB are issued by a company which can be redeemed either at maturity or at a price assured by the issuer. In case the company fails to reach the assured price, bond issuer is to get it redeemed. The price and the yield on the bond moves on the opposite direction. The higher the yield, lower is the price.

Foreign currency convertible bonds are equity linked debt securities that are to be converted  into equity or depository receipts after a specified period. thus a holder of FCCB has the option of either converting it into equity share at a predetermined price or exchange rate, or retaining the bonds.

See also
 American depositary receipt
 Global Depository Receipts

References

External links
 Times of India http://timesofindia.indiatimes.com/business/india-business/FCCB-repayments-may-test-Indian-cos-in-2011/articleshow/7356735.cms retrieved on January 31, 2011
 Institute of Chartered Accountants of India http://www.icai.org/resource_file/10351703-708.pdf retrieved on January 31, 2011